The Crown Colony of Penang was a British crown colony from 1946 to 1957. It came under British sovereignty after being ceded by the Sultanate of Kedah in 1786, and had been part of the Straits Settlements from 1826 to 1946. Together with Singapore, it became a crown colony under the direct control of the British Colonial Office in London until it was incorporated into the Malayan Union. 

The British East India Company gained Penang in 1786 and established a trading post. It was ceded by the Sultan of Kedah to ensure the former's protection against the threat posed by its Siamese and Burmese neighbors. It was transformed into a Crown Colony, substituting state for company control through the Straits Settlement 1867.  During World War II, it was occupied by the Japanese from 1942 to 1945. 

After the post-war dissolution of the Straits Settlements Penang and Malacca become crown colonies in the Federation of Malaya, while Singapore became a standalone crown colony, separate from Malaya. In 1955, Tunku Abdul Rahman held a meeting with the British to discuss the end of British rule in Penang with a merger with Malayan Union (which was then replaced by Federation of Malaya). On 31 August 1957, when Malaya achieved its independence from the United Kingdom, Penang was integrated as a state of the federation, which later known as Malaysia when it merged with another territories in British Borneo.

References

History of Penang
British Malaya
Former countries in Malaysian history
Straits Settlements
States and territories established in 1946
States and territories disestablished in 1957